Torbjörn Martin (born 21 October 1981) is a Swedish film and music video director. His main work revolves around commercials and music videos. He has directed a feature-length documentary about Swedish rock band Mando Diao (released on DVD with the 2009 Mando Diao album Malevolence of Mando Diao) as well as the dramatic short film No Come Down that premiered at Gothenburg International Film Festival in 2009.

Videography
 Those Dancing Days for Those Dancing Days
 Conjure Me for Kristofer Åström
 The Dark for Kristofer Åström
 Cadillac for Pascal
 Baby Blue Eyes for Oholics
 Silly Really for Per Gessle
 On and On (UK & world edition) for Agnes
 Captain Cessna for Super Viral Brothers
 Sometimes I Forget for Agnes
 River en vacker dröm for Håkan Hellström
 Jag vet vilken dy hon varit i for Håkan Hellström
 999 for Kent
 Jag ser dig for Kent
 Tänd på for Kent
 Valborg for Håkan Hellström
 Ouf for Habz

Filmography
 Mando Diao – Live & unplugged at Svenska Grammofonstudion (2009)
 No Come Down (Ingen Kom Ner) (2009)
 "2 steg från Håkan" (2011)

References

External links 
 
 
 

Swedish film directors
1981 births
Living people